Alena Fedarynchyk (née Burak, born ) is a Belarusian volleyball player, playing as a libero. She is part of the Belarus women's national volleyball team.

She competed at the 2015 Women's European Volleyball Championship.

References

External links

1993 births
Living people
Belarusian women's volleyball players
Place of birth missing (living people)
Liberos